Marilynne Paspaley AM is an Australian film and television actress and businesswoman of Greek descent, who is best known for her role in the television series G. P. as Dr. Tessa Korkidas. She appeared in the movie Evil Angels (A Cry in the Dark) and other television series such as Water Rats.

Background 
Paspaley has been referred to as "daughter of Australia's most famous pearling dynasty", as she is a second generation member of the Paspaley family, well known in Australia as the largest producer of South Sea Pearls.

Order of Australia 
In 2008, Marilynne Paspaley was honoured with an Order Of Australia, for her contribution to the marketing and promotion of pearls and Australian designed jewellery.

Family
Paspaley is the daughter of Nicholas Paspaley Senior, Master Pearler and founder of the Paspaley Pearls empire. The business is now owned and operated by the next generation: her brother Nicholas Paspaley, her sister Roselynne Bracher and Marilynne Paspaley.

Marilynne Paspaley also owns and operates business interests in hospitality in the North West of Australia, including Pinctada Hotels and Resorts, The Kimberley Grande and McAlpine House in Broome. Paspaley is also known as a promoter of beach polo, being the founder of the annual Cable Beach Polo event in Broome, Western Australia.  Paspaley is also the Governor of the International Beach Polo Association (Australasian Region).

References

External links
 

Australian film actresses
Australian television actresses
Members of the Order of Australia
Australian people of Greek descent
Living people
Year of birth missing (living people)